Potassium chloride (KCl, or potassium salt) is a metal halide salt composed of potassium and chlorine. It is odorless and has a white or colorless vitreous crystal appearance. The solid dissolves readily in water, and its solutions have a salt-like taste. Potassium chloride can be obtained from ancient dried lake deposits. KCl is used as a fertilizer, in medicine, in scientific applications, domestic water softeners (as a substitute for sodium chloride salt), and in food processing, where it may be known as E number additive E508.

It occurs naturally as the mineral sylvite, and in combination with sodium chloride as sylvinite.

Uses

Fertilizer
The majority of the potassium chloride produced is used for making fertilizer, called potash, since the growth of many plants is limited by potassium availability.  Potassium chloride sold as fertilizer is known as muriate of potash. The vast majority of potash fertilizer worldwide is sold as muriate of potash.

Medical use

Potassium is vital in the human body, and potassium chloride by mouth is the common means to treat low blood potassium, although it can also be given intravenously. It is on the World Health Organization's List of Essential Medicines. Overdose causes hyperkalemia which can disrupt cell signaling to the extent that the heart will stop, reversibly in the case of some open heart surgeries.

Culinary use

It can be used as a salt substitute for food, but due to its weak, bitter, unsalty flavor, it is often mixed with ordinary table salt (sodium chloride) to improve the taste to form low sodium salt. The addition of 1 ppm of thaumatin considerably reduces this bitterness.  Complaints of bitterness or a chemical or metallic taste are also reported with potassium chloride used in food.

Industrial

As a chemical feedstock, it is used for the manufacture of potassium hydroxide and potassium metal. It is also used in medicine, lethal injections, scientific applications, food processing, soaps, and as a sodium-free substitute for table salt for people concerned about the health effects of sodium.

It is used as a supplement in animal feed to boost the potassium level in the feed. As an added benefit, it is known to increase milk production.

It is sometimes used in solution as a completion fluid in petroleum and natural gas operations, as well as being an alternative to sodium chloride in household water softener units.

Glass manufacturers use granular potash as a flux, lowering the temperature at which a mixture melts. Because potash imparts excellent clarity to glass, it is commonly used in eyeglasses, glassware, televisions, and computer monitors.

KCl is useful as a beta radiation source for calibration of radiation monitoring equipment, because natural potassium contains 0.0118% of the isotope 40K. One kilogram of KCl yields 16350 becquerels of radiation, consisting of 89.28% beta and 10.72% gamma, with 1.46083 MeV. In order to use off-the-shelf materials, it needs to be crystallized sequentially, using controlled temperature, in order to extract KCl, which is the subject of ongoing research. It also emits a relatively low level of 511 keV gamma rays from positron annihilation, which can be used to calibrate medical scanners.

Potassium chloride is used in some de-icing products designed to be safer for pets and plants, though these are inferior in melting quality to calcium chloride [lowest usable temperature  v. ]. It is also used in various brands of bottled water.

Potassium chloride was once used as a fire extinguishing agent, and in portable and wheeled fire extinguishers. Known as Super-K dry chemical, it was more effective than sodium bicarbonate-based dry chemicals and was compatible with protein foam. This agent fell out of favor with the introduction of potassium bicarbonate (Purple-K) dry chemical in the late 1960s, which was much less corrosive, as well as more effective. It is rated for B and C fires.

Along with sodium chloride and lithium chloride, potassium chloride is used as a flux for the gas welding of aluminium.

Potassium chloride is also an optical crystal with a wide transmission range from 210 nm to 20 µm. While cheap, KCl crystals are hygroscopic. This limits its application to protected environments or short-term uses such as prototyping. Exposed to free air, KCl optics will "rot". Whereas KCl components were formerly used for infrared optics, it has been entirely replaced by much tougher crystals such as zinc selenide.

Potassium chloride is used as a scotophor with designation P10 in dark-trace CRTs, e.g. in the Skiatron.

Toxicity

The typical amounts of potassium chloride found in the diet appear to be generally safe. In larger quantities, however, potassium chloride is toxic.

Chemical properties

Solubility
KCl is soluble in a variety of polar solvents.

Solutions of KCl are common standards, for example for calibration of the electrical conductivity of (ionic) solutions, since KCl solutions are stable, allowing for reproducible measurements.  In aqueous solution, it is essentially fully ionized into solvated  and  ions.

Redox and the conversion to potassium metal
Although potassium is more electropositive than sodium, KCl can be reduced to the metal by reaction with metallic sodium at 850 °C because the more volatile potassium can be removed by distillation (see Le Chatelier's principle):
KCl_{(l)}{} + Na_{(l)} <=> NaCl_{(l)}{} + K_{(g)}

This method is the main method for producing metallic potassium. Electrolysis (used for sodium) fails because of the high solubility of potassium in molten KCl.

Physical properties

Under ambient conditions the crystal structure of potassium chloride is like that of NaCl. It adopts a face-centered cubic structure known as the B1 phase with a lattice constant of roughly 6.3 Å. Crystals cleave easily in three directions. Other polymorphic and hydrated phases are adopted at high pressures.

Some other properties are
Transmission range: 210 nm to 20 µm
Transmittivity = 92% at 450 nm and rises linearly to 94% at 16 µm
Refractive index = 1.456 at 10 µm
Reflection loss = 6.8% at 10 µm (two surfaces)
dN/dT (expansion coefficient)= −33.2×10−6/°C
dL/dT (refractive index gradient)= 40×10−6/°C
Thermal conductivity = 0.036 W/(cm·K)
Damage threshold (Newman and Novak): 4 GW/cm2 or 2 J/cm2 (0.5 or 1 ns pulse rate); 4.2 J/cm2 (1.7 ns pulse rate Kovalev and Faizullov)

As with other compounds containing potassium, KCl in powdered form gives a lilac flame.

Production

Potassium chloride is extracted from minerals sylvite, carnallite, and potash. It is also extracted from salt water and can be manufactured by crystallization from solution, flotation or electrostatic separation from suitable minerals. It is a by-product of the production of nitric acid from potassium nitrate and hydrochloric acid.

The vast majority of potassium chloride is produced as agricultural and industrial grade potash in Saskatchewan, Canada, as well as Russia and Belarus. Saskatchewan alone accounted for over 25% of the world's potash production in 2017.

Laboratory methods
Potassium chloride is inexpensively available and is rarely prepared intentionally in the laboratory.  It can be generated by treating potassium hydroxide (or other potassium bases) with hydrochloric acid:
KOH  +  HCl  -> KCl  +  H2O

This conversion is an acid-base neutralization reaction. The resulting salt can then be purified by recrystallization. Another method would be to allow potassium to burn in the presence of chlorine gas, also a very exothermic reaction:
2 K + Cl2  -> 2 KCl

References

Further reading

External links 
 

Alkali metal chlorides
Chlorides
Dietary minerals
123456789
Inorganic fertilizers
Lethal injection components
Metal halides
Potash
Potassium compounds
World Health Organization essential medicines
E-number additives
Rock salt crystal structure